Stenodiscus is an extinct genus of bryozoan of the family Stenoporidae, known from the Carboniferous to the Upper Permian periods. Its colonies were large and could be encrusting, massive, or branching, sometimes made of multiple layers of growth over themselves, and usually possessed monticules with abundant large acanthostyles.

Species
The following species are recognized:

References

Prehistoric bryozoan genera
Trepostomata